Aztec society was traditionally divided into social classes. They became sophisticated once the Mexica people settled and began to build the Aztec Empire. The class structure was so elaborate that it impressed the Spanish almost as much as Aztec architecture.

History 
The Mexica people, who became the nucleus of the Aztec empire, were a nomadic tribe. As they moved south, they came into contact with more advanced peoples. Many cultures looked back to the culture of the Toltecs, and the Aztecs came to admire Toltec heritage. Eventually, the word for artistic creations would be toltecayotl, for the Toltecs, and the Aztecs would claim to be descended from Toltec nobles.

Classes

Upper 
The Mexicans were anxious to claim a Toltec heritage, so they chose a nobleman of Toltec origin as their first king, a man named Acamapichtli. He had 20 wives, and his descendants became the heart of a new social class - the nobles or pipiltin (singular pilli). From then on, a king was always chosen from among the pipiltin.

Ruling positions were not hereditary, but preference was given to those in the "royal families." Originally pipiltin status was not hereditary, but as the sons of pillis had access to better resources and education it was easier for them to become pillis. Later, the class system took on hereditary aspects.

The nobles had many other privileges. They generally received more education, and were allowed to wear fancier clothes and decorate their houses. They were allowed to hold important government offices, but not all had positions of authority - some were craftsmen or even palace servants. Those who served with distinction could move up the ranks.

Lower 
The second class were the macehualtin (people), originally peasants.  Eduardo Noguera estimates that in later stages only 20% of the population was dedicated to agriculture, and food production. The other 80% of society were warriors, artisans and traders.

Slaves or tlacotin constituted an important class. Aztecs could become slaves because of debts, as a criminal punishment, or as war captives. A slave could have possessions and even own other slaves. Slavery in Aztec society was in some ways more humane than in Western cultures. While some slaves were punished as criminals or prisoners of war, others sold themselves or their children into slavery due to economic hardship. Slaves could free themselves by repaying their purchase price. They could marry and own property, and their children were born free.

Traveling merchants called pochteca were a small, but important class as they not only facilitated commerce but also communicated vital information across the empire and beyond its borders. They were often employed as spies.

See also
 Aztec

References

Aztec society
Social classes